Bugs is a nickname for:

Arthur "Bugs" Baer (1886-1969), American journalist
Bugs Bennett (1892–1957), Major League Baseball pitcher
Bugs Bunny, a Warner Brothers cartoon character
Bob Bugden (born 1936), Australian former professional rugby league footballer
Ben "Bugs" Hardaway (1895-1957), American storyboard artist, animator, voice actor, gagman, writer and director
Bugs Henderson (1943–2012), blues guitarist
Fred Kommers (1886-1943), Major League Baseball outfielder
Bugs Moran (1892–1957), American gangster
Bugs Raymond (1882–1912), Major League Baseball pitcher
Bugs Reisigl (1887–1957), Major League Baseball pitcher
Bugsy Siegel (1906-1947), American mobster also nicknamed "Bugs"
Bill Werle (1920-2010), Major League Baseball pitcher

See also 

 
 
 Bugsy (disambiguation)

Lists of people by nickname